Cape Barne is a steep, rocky bluff rising to 120 m between Cape Royds and Cape Evans on the west side of Ross Island. Discovered by the Discovery expedition, 1901–04, under Robert F. Scott, and named by him for Lieutenant Michael Barne, Royal Navy, a member of the expedition.

Headlands of Ross Island